The Doubles luge competition at the 1988 Winter Olympics in Calgary was held on 19 February, at Canada Olympic Park.

Results

References

Luge at the 1988 Winter Olympics
Men's events at the 1988 Winter Olympics